Yohander Manuel Méndez Ortega (born January 17, 1995) is a Venezuelan professional baseball pitcher for the Yomiuri Giants of the Nippon Professional Baseball (NPB). He made his Major League Baseball (MLB) debut in 2016 for the Texas Rangers.

Professional career

Texas Rangers
Méndez signed with the Texas Rangers as an international free agent in July 2011 out of Venezuela for $1.5MM. Mendez made his professional debut in 2012 with the DSL Rangers, posting a 2–1 record with a 1.99 ERA in 45.1 innings. In 2013 he made his stateside debut with the Spokane Indians, posting a 1–2 record with a 3.78 ERA in 33.1 innings. Mendez split the 2014 season between he AZL Rangers and Hickory Crawdads, posting a combined 3–1 record with a 2.70 ERA in 36.2 innings. Mendez spent the entire 2015 season with the Hickory Crawdads, posting a 3–3 with a 2.44 ERA in 66.1 innings. The Rangers added him to their 40-man roster after the 2015 season. Mendez split the 2016 minor league season between the High Desert Mavericks, Frisco RoughRiders, and the Round Rock Express. He posted a combined 12–3 record with a 2.19 ERA in 111 innings. After the trade deadline of the 2016 season, Mendez became the team's no. 2 prospect after the Rangers dealt  Luis Ortiz and Lewis Brinson to the Brewers for catcher Jonathan Lucroy.

Méndez was promoted to the Major Leagues during September call-ups on September 2, 2016 after having an ERA of 2.19 as a starter in the minors. He made his Major League debut on September 5 coming out of the bullpen allowing five earned runs while pitching one inning against the Seattle Mariners. He appeared in just two games that September, throwing 3 innings with a 18.00 ERA.

Mendez split the 2017 season between the Frisco RoughRiders and the Rangers. In 24 games (24 starts) with Frisco he posted a 7–8 with a 3.79 ERA in 137.2 innings. In 7 relief outings for the Rangers, he posted a 0–1 record with a 5.11 ERA in 12.1 innings.

Mendez opened the 2018 season with the Round Rock Express. He was on the Rangers active roster when on June 19, he was optioned back to AAA for violating an unspecified team rule after a game in Kansas City the night prior. Mendez was demoted down to the Down East Wood Ducks on June 25, for what the organization called a "reset" on his development. Mendez worked his way back up through AA and AAA, before being recalled to the major league roster on September 2. Mendez posted a combined 2–10 record with a 4.71 ERA in 122.1 innings between the Down East Wood Ducks, Frisco Roughriders, and the Round Rock Express. In 8 games (5 starts) with the Rangers in 2018, Mendez posted a 2–2 record with a 5.53 ERA in 27.2 innings. During the 2018 offseason the Rangers announced that they were given a 4th minor league option on Mendez that would allow them to option him to the minor leagues during the 2019 season. On March 19, 2019, the team announced that Mendez would not need season ending surgery, instead he would be available by midseason. Mendez was placed on the 60-day injured list to open the 2019 season. He returned to Texas on September 5, and finished the season going 1–0 with a 5.79 ERA over  innings. 

On July 23, 2020, Méndez was outrighted off of the 40-man roster. Mendez did not play in a game in 2020 due to the cancellation of the Minor League Baseball season because of the COVID-19 pandemic. He became a free agent on November 2, 2020.

Leones de Yucatán
On February 24, 2021, Méndez signed with the Leones de Yucatán of the Mexican League.

Sultanes de Monterrey
On December 6, 2021, Méndez signed with the Milwaukee Milkmen of the American Association of Professional Baseball. However, on February 15, 2022, prior to the 2022 AA season, his contract was purchased by the Sultanes de Monterrey of the Mexican League.

Yomiuri Giants
On December 13, 2022, Mendez signed with the Yomiuri Giants of Nippon Professional Baseball.

See also
 List of Major League Baseball players from Venezuela

References

External links

1995 births
Living people
Arizona League Rangers players
Dominican Summer League Rangers players
Frisco RoughRiders players
Hickory Crawdads players
High Desert Mavericks players
Major League Baseball pitchers
Major League Baseball players from Venezuela
Mexican League baseball pitchers
Nashville Sounds players
Navegantes del Magallanes players
Round Rock Express players
Spokane Indians players
Sportspeople from Valencia, Venezuela
Sultanes de Monterrey players
Texas Rangers players
Venezuelan expatriate baseball players in the Dominican Republic
Venezuelan expatriate baseball players in Mexico
Venezuelan expatriate baseball players in the United States